Hüseyin Vasıf Çınar (1895–1935) was a Turkish educator, politician, journalist and diplomat.

Early years 
He was born on Crete. He was of Kurdish descend, and was the son of Abdullah Hulusi Bey, a son of Emir Bedirkhan, Emir of the Bohtan Emirate. In 1892 the Bedirkhan family were sent to exile in Crete by Abdulhamid II for their alleged influence in the murder of Ridvan Pasha. Most were later allowed to return to Istanbul, other members of the family settled to Europe, Syria and Egypt where they married within the elite and the Royal circles. After highschool he studied law. Between 1915–1918 he served as a teacher with his close friend Mustafa Necati. After the occupation of İzmir on 15 May 1919 by the Greek army however, they went to Balıkesir to publish a newspaper named İzmir'e Doğru ("Towards İzmir") to support the nationalistic resistance . They also founded a society named Red'i ilhak ("Opposing occupation").

Politics
During the Republican era, he represented Saruhan (present Manisa) in the 3rd Parliament of Turkey. His rhetoric was influential in the abolition of the caliphate. He also served in Independence tribunals. In the 2nd and 5th government of Turkey, he was the Minister of National Education. During his brief service in the 5th government, he was instrumental to carry the alphabet reform and nation's schools, which were started by his friend Nustafa Necati.

Diplomacy
He was one of the early diplomats of the Turkish Republic. He represented Turkey in Prague (1925–1927), Budapest (1928), Rome (1932–1934) and Moscow (1934–1935). He died on 2 June 1935, during his service in Moscow.

Legacy
A school in Istanbul is named after Vasıf Çınar. Çınar's essays published in the newspaper İzmir'e Doğru of 1919 were compiled by Tülay Alim Baran and published by the municipality of Balıkesir .

References

1895 births
1935 deaths
People from İzmir
Ministers of National Education of Turkey
20th-century Turkish diplomats
20th-century Turkish journalists
Republican People's Party (Turkey) politicians
Members of the 2nd government of Turkey
Members of the 5th government of Turkey
Istanbul University Faculty of Law alumni
Turkish schoolteachers
Ambassadors of Turkey to Hungary
Members of the 2nd Parliament of Turkey